United States Coast Guard Station (Small) Scituate is a comparatively small and seasonally open United States Coast Guard station located in Scituate, Massachusetts.  It is operated jointly with Station Point Allerton and falls under Sector Boston.

See also
List of military installations in Massachusetts

References

External links
Station Point Allerton Station (small) Scituate (dead link 10 July 2020)

United States Coast Guard stations
Military installations in Massachusetts
Buildings and structures in Scituate, Massachusetts